Sigþór Júlíusson (born 27 April 1975) is a retired Icelandic football defender.

References

1975 births
Living people
Sigthor Juliusson
Sigthor Juliusson
Sigthor Juliusson
Sigthor Juliusson
Association football defenders
Sigthor Juliusson